Alex Rüdinger (born November 18, 1991) is an American drummer. He started playing drums at the age of 13, and since then he has played for numerous metal bands including Conquering Dystopia, the Faceless and Threat Signal. He has also done a variety of session work, both live and in the studio. Some of the bands he has worked for are Revocation, Monuments, Evan Brewer, Whitechapel, Light the Torch and Intronaut.

Gear 
Rüdinger uses and endorses Tama drums and hardware, Meinl cymbals, Evans drumheads, Vic Firth drumsticks, Trick pedals, 1964 Ears in-ear monitors, 2box electronics, Gator cases and Vratim drum shoes.

Membership in bands 
Current
 7 Horns 7 Eyes (2018–present)
 Conquering Dystopia (2013–present)
 Light the Torch (2021–present)
 Ordinance (2009–present)

Former
 Azrael
 Samadhi
 Burning Shadows (2006–2008)
 Threat Signal (2010, 2011–2012)
 The HAARP Machine (2012–2013)
The Faceless (2013–2014)
 Good Tiger (2015–2018)

Live
 Evan Brewer (2014)
 Monuments (2014)
 Revocation (2015)
 Whitechapel (2019–2021)

Session
 Midnight Realm (2012)
 Cognizance (2013–2014)
 War of Ages (2017)
 Intronaut (2020)
 Merrow (2021)

Discography

Ordinance 
 Internal Monologues (2011)
 The Ides of March (2016)

Threat Signal 
 Threat Signal (2011)

Cognizance 
 Inquisition (2013)
 Inceptum (2014)

Conquering Dystopia 
 Conquering Dystopia (2014)

Good Tiger 
 A Head Full of Moonlight (2015)
  We Will All Be Gone (2018)

Intronaut 
 Fluid Existential Inversions (2020)

Merrow 
 The Nasum EP (2020)

Whitechapel 
 Kin (2021)

References

External links 

 

1991 births
Living people
American drummers
American people of German descent
Death metal musicians
Musicians from Maryland
People from Frederick, Maryland
21st-century American drummers
Conquering Dystopia members
The Faceless members